The xD-Picture Card is an obsolete form of flash memory card, used in digital cameras made by Olympus, Fujifilm, and Kodak during the 2000s. The xD in the xD-Picture Card stands for eXtreme Digital.

xD cards were manufactured with capacities of 16 MB up to 2 GB. The standard was phased out in the late 2000s in favour of the SD card, which had been its primary competitor.

History 
The cards were developed by Olympus and Fujifilm, and introduced into the market in July 2002. Toshiba Corporation and Samsung Electronics manufactured the cards for Olympus and Fujifilm. xD cards were sold under other brands, including Kodak, SanDisk, PNY, and Lexar, but were not branded with the respective companies' logos, except for Kodak. Previously, xD competed primarily with Secure Digital (SD) cards, CompactFlash (CF), and Sony's Memory Stick. Because of its higher cost and limited usage in products other than digital cameras, xD lost ground to SD, which is broadly used by cellular phones, personal computers, digital audio players and many other digital cameras.

Olympus began to move away from the xD format with the mid-2009 announcement of the E-P1 camera, which supported only Secure Digital memory cards. As of Spring 2010, all new Olympus cameras announced at the 2010 Consumer Electronics Show and Photo Marketing Association International Trade Show can use SD cards. This changeover to the SD card format has never been officially announced by Olympus Corporation. The higher-end DSLR cameras such as the E-3 and E-5 among others continue to use CompactFlash cards as well. Certain final Olympus cameras using xD cards are also supporting microSD cards with a special, included adapter.

Fuji released its last digital camera accepting that card, namely Fujifilm FinePix F200EXR (a variant of 2008 FinePix F100fd), being released back in Q2 2009, as being moving away from xD format since Q4 2008.

Comparison with rival formats 

Amazon  Best Sellers in xD-Picture Cards reports no products offered with a Date First Available since 4 August 2009.

Advantages 
 Contains no flash translation layer (designed to emulate the block device structure of a magnetic disk drive). Better-designed flash file systems can directly access the NAND flash hardware.
 Very similar to a standard NAND chip. Modified XD readers can be used to read arbitrary NAND chips.

Disadvantages 
 Card format is proprietary to Fujifilm and Olympus, just as the Memory Stick format is to Sony. No public documentation was available (see below for reverse-engineering results). In contrast, the CompactFlash format is described by completely open and free specifications.
 Has not kept up with the transfer rate, or speed, of other cards, notably CompactFlash and SD, but also the later versions of the Memory Stick. The fastest xD card offers less than 10% of the speed of current (2009) CompactFlash cards.
 Directly derived from the SmartMedia card. Thus, has no wear leveling controller. May have a shorter life span than comparable cards with FTL wear levelers if the file system used does not take into account wear leveling.
 Generally more expensive than other memory card types. , 2 GB (2000 MB) xD cards' retail prices are approximately three times those of same-capacity SD cards.
 Many newer Olympus and Fujifilm digital cameras accept the more popular SD or CF cards, in addition to or instead of the xD format.
 Small maximum capacity relative to other memory card formats. First-generation xD cards (Type S) have a maximum capacity of only 512 MB. Type M expands the theoretical maximum capacity to 8 GB (8000 MB), but , there are no cards available with capacity greater than 2 GB.
 Although physically smaller than Secure Digital and Memory Stick cards, xD cards are larger than these competitors' reduced-size variants (microSD and Memory Stick Micro).
 Less widely supported by camera, card reader, and accessory manufacturers than other formats. , SD cards (and variants) are supported by all consumer-level digital cameras from major manufacturers.

Type M/M+ and Type H cards 

The original xD cards (Type S) were available in 16 MB to 512 MB capacities. The Type M card, released in February 2005, uses multi-level cell (MLC) architecture to achieve a theoretical storage capacity of up to 8 GB. , Type M cards are available in sizes from 256 MB to 2 GB. However, the Type M suffers from slower read/write speeds than the original cards.

The Type H card, first released in November 2005, offers higher data rates than Type M cards (theoretically as much as 3 times faster). As of 2008, Type H cards were only available in 256 MB, 512 MB, 1000 MB, and 2000 MB capacities. Both Fuji and Olympus discontinued the production of Type H cards in 2008, citing high production costs.

The Type M+ card, first released in April 2008, offers data rates 1.5 times that of Type M cards. As of 2008, cards are available only in 1 and 2 GB capacities.

Olympus says that its xD cards support special "picture effects" when used in some Olympus cameras, though these software features are not intrinsically hardware-dependent. Type H and M+ cards however, are required in newer models to capture video at high rate (640×480 @ 30fps). Due to changes in the cards' storage architecture, newer Type M and H cards may have compatibility issues with some older cameras (especially video recording). Compatibility lists are available for Olympus: Olympus America's and Fujifilm's. Newer cards are incompatible with some card readers.

Theoretical transfer speeds 

Pictures may be transferred from a digital camera's xD card to a personal computer by plugging the camera into the PC by a USB or IEEE 1394 cable, or by removing the card from the camera and inserting it into a card reader. In both cases, the computer sees the card as a mass storage device containing image files, although software or firmware can alter this representation. Card readers may be integrated into the PC or attached by cable. Adapters are available to allow an xD picture card to be plugged into other readers (and in some cases cameras), including PC card, parallel port, CompactFlash and SmartMedia.

Chart: Type Year Speed Size

Reverse-engineered specifications 
Detailed specifications are tightly controlled by Olympus and Fujifilm, which charge licensing fees and royalties and require non-disclosure agreements in exchange for the technical information required to produce xD-compatible devices.

The memory format used is not well documented. It is difficult to study it directly, since most camera devices and most USB card readers do not provide direct access to the flash memory. Since the cards are controller-less, cameras and card readers must perform wear leveling and error detection. They normally hide the portion of the memory which stores this information (among other things) from higher level access.

However, a few models of xD card readers based on the Alauda chip do allow direct access (bypassing the above mechanisms) to an xD card's flash memory. These readers have been reverse-engineered and Linux drivers have been produced by the Alauda Project, which has documented the on-chip data structures of the xD card. According to this information, xD card headers are similar to those used by SmartMedia, and include chip manufacturer information.

Raw hardware 

At the raw hardware level, an xD card is simply an ordinary NAND flash integrated circuit in an unusual package. Comparing the pinout of an xD card to the pinout of a NAND flash chip in a standard TSOP package, one finds a nearly one-to-one correspondence between the active pins of the two devices. xD cards share this characteristic with the older SmartMedia cards, which are also basically raw NAND flash chips, albeit in a larger package.

xD and SmartMedia cards can be used by hobbyists as a convenient source of NAND flash memory chips for custom projects. For example, the Mattel Juice Box PMP can be booted into Linux using a modified cartridge containing an xD card with a boot image written on it. Additionally, SmartMedia and xD card readers can be used to read the data from NAND flash chips in electronic devices, by soldering leads between the chip and the card reader.

Panoramic mode 
Some Olympus cameras offer camera-based panoramic processing.  In those cameras that support both xD and CompactFlash cards, panoramic processing only works with images stored on the xD card, if installed. Newer Olympus cameras have neither xD cards nor this restriction.

Unsubtantiated reports claim that some cameras such as the E-450 only support panoramic processing when using Olympus branded xD cards.  The model numbers have not been documented.  In this case, there appears to be a workaround: it appears that the card manufacturer information is simply stored in the flash memory, in the Card Information Structure. Thus, it is possible to alter another brand of xD card to present itself as Olympus xD card by accessing the raw flash memory. This can be done by using a hacked device driver for a USB card reader.

See also 
 Comparison of memory cards
 Format war

References

External links 
 XD-Picture Card Connector Pinout allpinouts.org, 2011-07-25
 Alauda XD-Picture Card Linux Driver Development

Solid-state computer storage media
Computer-related introductions in 2002
Discontinued media formats